N. S. Balaraman was an Indian politician and former Member of the Legislative Assembly of Tamil Nadu. He was elected to the Tamil Nadu legislative assembly as a Dravida Munnetra Kazhagam candidate from Arakkonam constituency in the 1971 election.

References 

Dravida Munnetra Kazhagam politicians
Year of birth missing
Possibly living people
Tamil Nadu MLAs 1971–1976